Bimmen is a village of the town of Kleve, in the district of Kleve in the west of the federal state of North Rhine-Westphalia, Germany.

The tiny village has an area of 2.09 km² and a population of about 170.

Bimmen is situated on the left or south bank of the Rhine and borders the Dutch village of Millingen aan de Rijn in the province of Gelderland.

References

External links 
Bimmen, Stadt Kleve

Kleve
Villages in North Rhine-Westphalia